Punctoterebra contracta is a species of sea snail, a marine gastropod mollusk in the family Terebridae, the auger snails.

Description

Distribution
This marine species occurs off Papua New Guinea.

References

External links
 Smith, E. A. (1873). Remarks on a few species belonging to the family Terebridae, and descriptions of several new forms in the collection of the British Museum. Annals and Magazine of Natural History. ser. 4, 11: 262-271
 Fedosov, A. E.; Malcolm, G.; Terryn, Y.; Gorson, J.; Modica, M. V.; Holford, M.; Puillandre, N. (2020). Phylogenetic classification of the family Terebridae (Neogastropoda: Conoidea). Journal of Molluscan Studies

Terebridae
Gastropods described in 1873